Carlo Durante (June 27, 1946 – May 24, 2020) was an Italian paralympic athlete, who mainly competed in category T11 marathon events.

Carlo ran in the marathon at the 1992 Summer Olympics, winning the gold medal in the B1 event. He also participated in the 1996 Summer Paralympics and the 2000 Summer Paralympics, taking a silver medal in the T10 marathon in 1996 and winning the bronze medal in the T11 event in 2000. His final appearance was in the 2004 Summer Paralympics, though he did not medal.

References

External links
 

1946 births
2020 deaths
Paralympic athletes of Italy
Athletes (track and field) at the 1992 Summer Paralympics
Athletes (track and field) at the 1996 Summer Paralympics
Athletes (track and field) at the 2000 Summer Paralympics
Athletes (track and field) at the 2004 Summer Paralympics
Paralympic gold medalists for Italy
Paralympic silver medalists for Italy
Paralympic bronze medalists for Italy
Medalists at the 1992 Summer Paralympics
Medalists at the 1996 Summer Paralympics
Medalists at the 2000 Summer Paralympics
Place of birth missing
Paralympic medalists in athletics (track and field)
Visually impaired marathon runners
Paralympic marathon runners